The Chapel of Mercy is a Roman Catholic church on the Rue Basse in Monaco's Monaco-Ville district.

The chapel was built in 1639 and served as the seat of the Brotherhood of the Black Penitents. Honoré II, Prince of Monaco served as the brotherhood's first prior. The interior decoration features wooden sculpture by François Joseph Bosio.

References

External links

1639 establishments in Monaco
Monaco-Ville
Roman Catholic churches completed in 1639
Roman Catholic churches in Monaco
17th-century Roman Catholic church buildings